Maciej Rybiński (24 February 1784 in Slavuta  in Wołyń, 17 January 1874 in Paris), Polish general, last chief of State of November Uprising.

1784 births
1874 deaths
Burials at Montmartre Cemetery
People from Slavuta
Polish commanders of the Napoleonic Wars
Generals of the November Uprising